Jackson v McClintock (1998) 8 TCLR 161 is a cited case in New Zealand regarding relief under the Contractual Remedies Act 1979.

References

New Zealand contract case law